Tschappat or Tschäppät is a surname. Notable people with the surname include:

 Alexander Tschäppät (1952–2018), Swiss politician
 John Chalmers Tschappat (1896–1958), American football player
 Reynold Tschäppät (1917–1979), Swish politician
William H. Tschappat (1874–1955), career officer in the United States Army